Paul Woodruff (born 1943) is a classicist, professor of philosophy, and dean at The University of Texas at Austin, where he once chaired the department of philosophy and has more recently held the Hayden Head Regents Chair as director of Plan II Honors program, which he resigned in 2006 after 15 years of service. On September 21, 2006, University President William C. Powers, Jr. named Dr. Woodruff the inaugural dean of undergraduate studies. He is best known for his work on Socrates, Plato, and philosophy of theater.  A beloved professor, he often teaches courses outside his Ancient Greek Philosophy specialty, including literature courses and specialty seminars, often for the Plan II program.

Biography 
Born in New Jersey (though raised in western Pennsylvania), Woodruff attended Princeton University, where he completed a major in Classics in 1965. His studies then took him to Merton College of Oxford University as a Marshall Scholar, where he completed a Bachelor's Degree in Literae Humaniores in 1968. Inspired by the Socratic beliefs on rule of law, he served in the United States Army in the Vietnam War from 1969 to 1971, during which time he attained the rank of Captain.  Returning to the United States, he again attended Princeton University, where he completed his doctorate in Philosophy, studying under Gregory Vlastos.

In the same year, he joined the Department of Philosophy at the University of Texas at Austin, where he has remained to this day.

In 1974 he married Lucia Woodruff and they had two children (Rachel Woodruff in 1975, and Katherine Lange in 1977) and now have six grandchildren (Jane Lange 2005 (deceased), Zora Daniel 2008, Megan Lange 2009, Sofia Daniel 2011, Cora Lange 2012, and Ruth Lange (2015).

Bibliography

Books 

 Reverence; Renewing a Forgotten Virtue Oxford University Press (2001)
 First Democracy; The Challenge of an Ancient Idea Oxford University Press (2005)
 The Necessity of Theater; The Art of Watching and Being Watched Oxford University Press (2008)
 The Ajax Dilemma: Justice, Fairness, and Rewards Oxford University Press (2011)

Translations 
 Plato: Two Comic Dialogues (Ion and Hippias Major) Hackett (1983)
 Plato: Symposium (with Alexander Nehamas) Hackett (1999)
 Thucydides on Justice, Power, and Human Nature Hackett (1993)
 Plato: Phaedrus (with Alexander Nehamas) Hackett (1995)
 Euripides Bacchae Hackett (1998)
 Sophocles Oedipus Tyrannus (with Peter Meineck) Hackett (2000)
 Sophocles: Antigone  Hackett (2001)
 Sophocles: Theban Plays, with Introductions by Paul Woodruff (with Peter Meineck) Hackett (2003)

Editor 
 Facing Evil; Light at the Core of Darkness. (with Harry A. Wilmer) Open Court Press (1988)
 Early Greek Political Thought from Homer to the Sophists (with Michael Gagarin) Cambridge University Press (1995)
 Reason and Religion in Socratic Philosophy (edited, with Nicholas D. Smith) Oxford University Press (2000)

Critical studies and reviews

Awards and recognition

Awards 
 Harry Ransom Teaching Award
 Academy of Distinguished Teachers
 Austin Book Award
 B. Iden Payne Award for best new play (1983)
 Pro Bene Meritis (2002)
 Civitatis (2007)

Academic positions 
 Dean of Undergraduate Studies
 Chair, Department of Philosophy
 Hayden Head Chair as Director of the Plan II Honors Program
 Mary Helen Thompson Centennial Professor in the Humanities

See also
 American philosophy
 List of American philosophers
 Reverence (emotion)

External links
Biography as Dean of Undergraduate Studies
Biography
PBS Now interview with Bill Moyers

1943 births
Living people
United States Army personnel of the Vietnam War
American philosophers
American philosophy academics
American scholars of ancient Greek philosophy
University of Texas at Austin faculty
Alumni of Merton College, Oxford
Translators of Ancient Greek texts
Princeton University alumni
Marshall Scholars
United States Army officers